The Xenaverse is a television franchise created by Sam Raimi, including the series Hercules: The Legendary Journeys, Xena: Warrior Princess, and Young Hercules.  It also includes the wider intertextual and multimedia coverage of the series by academic writers, media professionals and enthusiasts.

References

Hercules: The Legendary Journeys
Xena: Warrior Princess
Television franchises
Mass media franchises introduced in 1995
Fictional universes
Mythopoeia